Kızılpınar  is a neighborhood in Çerkezköy district of Tekirdağ Province, Turkey. At  it is almost merged to Çerkezköy. The population of Kızılpınar is 54,269  as of 2022. The neighborhood was founded by Muslim refugees from Bulgaria during the Russo-Turkish War (1877-1878). According to Mayor's page, some members of Malkoçoğlu Family of the Ottoman Empire were among these refugees.

References

External links
 Tekirdağ Governor's Official Website
 Metropolitan Municipality of Tekirdağ
 District municipality's Official Website

Populated places in Tekirdağ Province
Towns in Turkey
Çerkezköy District